Tboli, also Tau Bilil, Tau Bulul or Tagabilil, is an Austronesian language spoken in the southern Philippine island of Mindanao, mainly in the province of South Cotabato  but also in the neighboring provinces of Sultan Kudarat and Sarangani.  According to the Philippine Census from 2000, close to 100,000 Filipinos identified T'boli or Tagabili as their native language.

Classification
Tboli is classified as a member of the South Mindanao or Bilic branch of the Philippine language families. The closest language to it is Blaan. Both are also related to Bagobo, and Tiruray.

Geographic distribution
Tboli is spoken in the following areas (Ethnologue).

South Cotabato Province: Mount Busa area and west
Sarangani Province: Celebes seacoast, Katabau west to provincial border
Sultan Kudarat Province: Kraun area and Bagumbayan municipality

Dialects are Central Tboli, Western Tboli, and Southern Tboli (Ethnologue).

Phonology

Phonemic inventory

 list seven vowel phonemes, namely  and 15 consonant phonemes shown in the chart below. Note that Tboli lacks  as a phoneme and has  instead, which is a typological rarity among Philippine languages.

Stress

Final stress is the norm in Tboli rootwords; however, the stress shifts to the previous syllable if the final vowel is a schwa.

Phonotactics

Unlike most other Philippine languages and Austronesian languages in general, Tboli permits a variety of consonant clusters at the onset of a syllable. This is evident in the name of the language, but also in other words like  'dust', 'one month,'  'starry,'  'temporarily,'  'before,' and others.

 observe impressionistically there is a very short schwa pronounced in between the consonant cluster. However, these consonant clusters have not yet been analyzed acoustically.

Grammar

Nouns

Unlike other Philippine languages, Tboli does not make use of case-marking articles.

Plurality is marked by the article  preceding the noun;  'horse' (sg.),  'horses.'

Pronouns

Tboli pronouns indicate person, number, clusivity, and grammatical role.  group Tboli pronouns into two main categories based on what they term "focus," which appear to be related to the absolutive-ergative case system in other Philippine languages.  There are two further subcategories for each which deal with whether the singular pronouns behave as enclitics or as independent words. Their use depends on their role and position in a sentence.

Examples using the third person plural pronoun.

 . 'They eat.' (focused, dependent pronoun).
 . 'They are the ones who ate.' (focused, independent pronoun)
 . 'Their house.' (nonfocused, dependent pronoun).
 . 'May God take care of them.' (nonfocused, independent pronoun).

Syntax

Word order in Tboli is usually verb-subject-object, though there is some variation.

Verbs

Tboli, like other Philippine languages, makes a distinction between transitive and intransitive verbs. Intransitive verbs are marked with the affix me- while transitive verbs are marked with ne-. Unlike Philippine languages, applicative affixes are not used in Tboli though prepositions are used instead.

Morphology

Tboli makes use of prefixes and infixes.  claim that suffixes do not exist in the language, though proclitic affixes may be thought of as such.

Writing system

Tboli has no official writing system, though the Latin script is usually used to write the language. The orthography is more or less similar to the one employed by Tagalog: b, d, f, g, h, k, l, m, n, ng (for ), s, t, w, and y (for ), though other letters may be used in writing foreign words.

 use a system of diacritics to accommodate the seven vowel phonemes of Tboli. The vowels are: a, i, é (for ), e (for ), ó (for ), u, and o (for ).

The glottal stop  is usually not represented in writing. Though the grave accent ` is used to represent it as in   'child' and   'serving spoon.'

Awed et al. note that sometimes that the apostrophe may be used to break up an initial consonant cluster as in the name of the language; that is, T'boli instead of simply Tboli. They note that native Tboli speakers have had "a very strong negative reaction" to this convention, preferring instead to write Tboli.

References

External links
tboli.webonary.org - Online version of SIL's "Tboli - English Dictionary."

Languages of South Cotabato
Languages of Sultan Kudarat
Languages of Sarangani
South Mindanao languages